HMS Triumph (N18) was a T-class submarine of the Royal Navy. She was laid down by Vickers at Barrow-in-Furness and launched in 1938.

Career
At the onset of the Second World War, Triumph was a member of the 2nd Submarine Flotilla. From 26–29 August 1939, the flotilla deployed to its war bases at Dundee and Blyth.

Home waters

On 26 December 1939, Triumph hit a German mine in the North Sea. She lost  of her bow when it was blown off and her pressure hull was also damaged, but her torpedoes did not detonate. She managed to limp back home under the protection of fighter aircraft and destroyers, and was under repair at Chatham Dockyard until 27 September 1940.

Mediterranean
Operating in the Mediterranean from early 1941, Triumph sank the Italian merchants Marzamemi, Colomba Lofaro, Ninfea, Monrosa, the Italian auxiliary patrol vessels V 136 / Tugnin F, Valoroso, V 190 / Frieda and V 137 / Trio Frassinetti, the Italian tug Dante de Lutti and salvage vessel , the German merchant Luvsee, and the Greek sailing vessels Panagiotis and Aghia Paraskeva.  She also damaged the Italian armed merchant cruiser , the Italian tankers Ardor and Poseidone, the Italian merchant Sidamo and the German merchant Norburg

In June 1941 she sank the Italian submarine  near northern Egypt.

Sinking

Triumph was also used for covert operations, such as landing agents in German-occupied areas. She was planned to be used as a rendezvous for commandos in Operation Colossus, but this had to be cancelled when the landing site became untenable.  She undertook one such mission in December 1941, in which she successfully landed agents in Greece. She was lost just over a week later, off Greece, probably to a collision with a mine in early January 1942. All fifty-nine crew were lost.

There is a memorial to her and her lost crew members in All Saints' Church, Lindfield, West Sussex.

References

Citations

Sources
 

 
 

 

British T-class submarines of the Royal Navy
Ships built in Barrow-in-Furness
1938 ships
World War II submarines of the United Kingdom
Maritime incidents in December 1939
Ships sunk by mines
World War II shipwrecks in the Mediterranean Sea
Maritime incidents in December 1941
Maritime incidents in January 1942
Ships lost with all hands